The Incredible Professor Zovek (Spanish: El increíble profesor Zovek) is a 1972 Mexican comedy film directed by René Cardona, starring Germán Valdés and Professor Zovek.

Plot
When a plane carrying 26 scientists blows up, only 25 bodies are found. Professor Zovek must determine who the 26th person was. Zovek must stop evil scientist Dr. Druso's plans for world domination.

Cast 
 Professor Zovek as himself
 Tere Velázquez
 Germán Valdés as Chalo
 José Galvez as Dr. Leobardo Druso
 Nubia Martí as Virginia
 Yerye Beirute
 Arturo Silva
 René Barrera 
 Juan José Martínez Casado
 Gloria Chávez
 Henry Trim
 María Cardinal

References

External links 
 

1972 films
1972 comedy films
Mexican comedy films
1970s Spanish-language films
Films directed by René Cardona
1970s Mexican films
Mexican horror films